Pittarthie Castle was a laird’s fortified house in Fife, Scotland. The name is spelled Pittarthie and Pittairthie in extant records. The ruins are protected as a scheduled monument.

History
The present house was built for James Monypenny of Pitmilly circa 1580. The King confirmed to Andrew Logan of Easter Granton and his heirs, “the lands of Pittarthie with certain others, including the fortalice, manor-place, etc., which had formerly been held of the Archbishop of St. Andrews by James Monypenny of Pitmelie and had been resigned by him in favour of the said Andrew”.

The estate was bought by Andrew Bruce, a son of William Bruce of Symbister, circa 1636 or 1644, and the house was remodeled by William Bruce of Pittarthie in 1653.  In 1654, William Bruce inherited the property from his father, Andrew Bruce.

In 1882, the house, called "Pittairthie Castle", was described as “a roofless ruin in the southwest of the [Dunino] parish, partly very ancient ... partly a structure of 1653; and in its oldest portion consists of a large square tower, with vaults beneath”.  The description “partly very ancient” may have resulted from observation of the coarser masonry at the bottom of the south wall, mentioned in the later description, which would suggest an even earlier structure had stood on the site.  The estate dates from the 14th century according to one report, which also states that the property passed to the Hannays of Kingsmuir sometime after about 1700.

The ruins
There are substantial remains of the hilltop house, which is built in an "L" plan with the jamb, its northwest corner bowed, attached to the southwest of the main block, and a stair tower in the inner angle.  The stonework is good quality rubble with ashlar dressings. but much coarser masonry appears at the bottom of the south wall, possibly evidence of an earlier building. It displays wonderfully decorative but now fairly useless defences—a gunloop beside the roll-moulded door, and pistol holes below all the window sills.

The date 1682 is carved, together with William Bruce's arms and initials, on a segmental pediment over the first floor hall's south window.  This window, like most of the others, has typically late 17th century rounded arrises.  The interior is derelict.  In the tunnel-vaulted jamb, there is a kitchen with a huge north fireplace, and a water inlet in the west wall.  Perhaps also of late 17th-century origin was the addition of a north stair turret.

A modern Ordnance Survey map shows Pittarthie Castle ruins located in a field southwest of Dunino, not far north of Carnbee, and the castle is also shown on some popular maps of Castles of Scotland.

References

Ruined castles in Fife
Scheduled Ancient Monuments in Fife
Tower houses in Scotland